Alexandra Carla Chidiac (born 15 January 1999) is an Australian international soccer player who plays as a midfielder for Racing Louisville in the NWSL and for the Australia national team.

Early life and education
Chidiac was born in Sydney, New South Wales, but moved to Adelaide, South Australia, when she was three months old, and considers herself South Australian.

She began playing youth football with Croydon Kings where she played alongside boys. In 2011, Chidiac won the under-14B-grade premiership. She was selected to play in the Football Federation South Australia Women's Premier League with an FFSA Under 14/15 team. In 2013, Chidiac was named Premier League player of the year after scoring 33 goals. When she played at the National Youth Championships in Coffs Harbour in July 2013, she was pronounced player of the tournament.

She attended St. Mary's College in Adelaide, taking classes by correspondence when she moved to Melbourne. After moving to Melbourne, Chidiac shared a home at La Trobe University with four other interstate players.

Club career

Adelaide United (2014)
Ahead of the 2014 W-League season, Chidiac was signed by Adelaide United. On 21 September 2014, she made her debut in a 1–0 loss to Canberra United. On 23 November 2014, she scored her first goal in a 2–2 draw with Western Sydney Wanderers. She finished the season with one goal in 9 appearances.

Melbourne City (2015–2016)
In September 2015, Chidiac signed with new W-League club Melbourne City, becoming the youngest member on Joe Montemurro’s star-studded squad. On 18 October 2015, she made her debut in a 6–0 win over Sydney FC. She made a total of 10 appearances and was part of Melbourne City's unbeaten season, which saw the team win the W-League premiership/championship double. She appeared as a late substitute in the 2016 W-League Grand Final.

Return to Adelaide United (2016–2018)
Chidiac returned to Adelaide United in September 2016, joining re-signing teammate Emily Condon and new coach Mark Jones. She made 8 appearances for the club in the 2016–17 season, scoring two goals. On 21 August 2017, Chidiac signed a new one-year contract with Adelaide United. She finished the 2017–18 season with one goal and three assists in 11 appearances.

Atlético Madrid (2018–2020)
On 13 July 2018, Chidiac signed with Atlético Madrid. She made her debut on 8 September 2018. In December 2020, Chidiac mutually terminated her contract with Atlético Madrid and left the club.

Return to Melbourne City (2020–2021)
In the week after leaving Atlético Madrid, Chidiac returned to Australia and re-joined Melbourne City ahead of the 2020–21 W-League season.

JEF United Chiba (2021–2022)
In June 2021, Chidiac joined JEF United Chiba to play in the inaugural season of the WE League.

Loan to Melbourne Victory (2021–2022)
In December 2021, Melbourne Victory signed Chidiac on loan from JEF United Chiba.

Racing Louisville (2022–)
Following her loan in Australia, Chidiac joined American club Racing Louisville on a free transfer, signing a one-year contract in April 2022, three weeks into their season.

Loan to Melbourne Victory (2022–)
In October 2022, Melbourne Victory announced that Chidiac will return to the club for the 2022–23 A-League Women on loan from Racing Louisville.

International career
In early 2015, Chidiac was called up to the senior Australia squad to tour New Zealand, aged sixteen. She made her international debut on 12 February 2015, coming on as a substitute for Lisa De Vanna in a win over New Zealand.

Chidiac was called up again ahead of the 2017 Algarve Cup, where she made two appearances.

Career statistics

Club

1Copa de la Reina.
2UEFA Women's Champions League

International goals
Scores and results list Australia's goal tally first.

Honours

Club
Melbourne City
W-League Premiership: 2015–16
W-League Championship: 2015–16

Atlético Madrid
Primera División: 2018–19

Individual
PFA Young Women's Footballer of the Year: 2017, 2018

References

External links

1999 births
Living people
Women's association football midfielders
Australia women's international soccer players
Australian women's soccer players
Expatriate women's footballers in Spain
Australian expatriate sportspeople in Spain
Adelaide United FC (A-League Women) players
Melbourne City FC (A-League Women) players
Atlético Madrid Femenino players
JEF United Chiba Ladies players
Melbourne Victory FC (A-League Women) players
Racing Louisville FC players
A-League Women players
Primera División (women) players
Australian expatriate women's soccer players
Australian expatriate sportspeople in Japan
Expatriate women's footballers in Japan
Australian expatriate sportspeople in the United States
Expatriate women's soccer players in the United States
Soccer players from Sydney
National Women's Soccer League players